Little Fuller Brook is a river in Delaware County, New York. It flows through Edwards Pond before converging with Horton Brook north-northeast of Horton.

References

Rivers of New York (state)
Rivers of Delaware County, New York